Alketas 'Alkis' Panagoulias (30 May 1934 – 18 June 2012) was a Greek association football player and manager. He managed the national teams of both Greece and the United States. He also managed several clubs, including Aris, his birthplace team, and Olympiakos with whom he won three Alpha Ethniki championships.

Early life and playing career
Alketas was born in Thessaloniki, Greece on 30 May 1934. Alketas started his football career as a player for Aris Thessaloniki F.C. in Thessaloniki, Greece.

Coaching career
After finishing his first degree, he moved to the United States, where he attended the University of New York City. There he coached the Greek American Atlas (also known as "New York Greek Americans") to three consecutive National Challenge Cup titles in 1967, 1968, and 1969.

He returned to Athens as the assistant coach of the Greece national football team, under the famous Northern Ireland coach Billy Bingham, in 1972; the following year, he took over as head coach, and helmed the team from 1973–1981, including Greece's first Euro appearance in 1980, in Italy. (Greece would not qualify for the Euro tournament again for a generation, until 2004, when they won the championship.) Panagoulias coached the famous Olympiacos C.F.P. from 1981–1983, earning the Alpha Ethniki title in 1982 and 1983.

He returned to the United States to become the head coach of the United States men's national soccer team, from 1983–1985. A professional version of the USMNT, called Team America, played in the North American Soccer League in 1983, based out of RFK Stadium in Washington, D.C. After many American stars refused to leave their NASL clubs to play for them, however, Team America could only manage a 10-20 record (and a last place finish) with a patchwork lineup. The following year, Panagoulias led the USA squad in the 1984 Summer Olympics in Los Angeles, with a 1-1-1 record in the group stage, not sufficient to advance to the next round. After failing to qualify for the 1986 FIFA World Cup in 1985, Panagoulias resigned as USMNT coach.

Panagoulias subsequently returned to Athens to coach Olympiacos C.F.P., winning another title in 1987. He also led Aris FC from 1987–1990 and Levadiakos from 1991–1992. He returned as head coach of the Greece national team in 1992 and led the team to its first appearance in a World Cup in 1994, played in his adopted country (by now, Panagoulias was an American citizen). Although he was very popular among Greek fans at the time, the team's poor performance in World Cup '94 (losing all three matches by a combined score of 0-10) attracted widespread criticism, and Panagoulias was replaced by Kostas Polychroniou. He later coached Iraklis FC in 1997 and Aris Thessaloniki F.C. from 1998–1999.

Later career
Following his retirement from coaching, Panagoulias served as President of Aris Thessaloniki F.C. in 2002. During the 2004 Athens Olympic Games, he served as venue manager for the soccer events held in Athens.  His biography, was published in Greece in November 2007.

He was elected member of the city council of Thessaloniki, and was a candidate for the Greek Parliament and a candidate for the European Parliament representing Greece in 1993. He was a FIFA instructor, a National Faculty member of the US Academy of Sports and a member of the USSF Coaches Council.

Panagoulias was a member of the U.S. Soccer Federation Hall of Fame.

In 2014, the side street adjacent to Aris Thessaloniki F.C. stadium, (Kleanthis Vikelidis Stadium), was named after him following a decision by the City Council of the Municipality of Thessaloniki.

Honours

Player

Club
Aris
EPSM Championship: 1952–53, 1958–59

Greek American AA
National Challenge Cup: 1967

Manager
Greek American AA
National Challenge Cup: 1968, 1969

Olympiacos
Super League Greece: 1981–82, 1982–83, 1986–87

References

External links
 The Greek, The Washington Post 
 The Long, Hard Struggle To Mold An American Team, The New York Times 
 Obituary, The Washington Post 
 FIFA Obituary
 Team America is Taking Shape, The New York Times  
 Obituary, Soccer America 
 Explaining The Lack of American Coaches Abroad
 Red, White, Blue and New, Sports Illustrated 

1934 births
1994 FIFA World Cup managers
Aris Thessaloniki F.C. players
Aris Thessaloniki F.C. managers
Aris Thessaloniki F.C. presidents
Greek footballers
Greek Macedonians
Greek football managers
Greek expatriate football managers
Greece national football team managers
Greek politicians
Greek emigrants to the United States
2012 deaths
Olympiacos F.C. managers
Super League Greece managers
Super League Greece players
Footballers from Thessaloniki
UEFA Euro 1980 managers
North American Soccer League (1968–1984) coaches
Expatriate soccer managers in the United States
United States men's national soccer team managers
Association football fullbacks
American expatriate soccer coaches
Greek expatriates in the United States
American Olympic coaches